David Wilder is an American leader of Israeli settlers and the spokesman for The Committee of The Jewish Community of Hebron.

History
David Wilder was born in New Jersey in the United States in 1954, and graduated from Case Western Reserve University with a BA in History and teacher certification in 1976. He went to Israel in 1974 and studied in Yeshiva for over eight years. He worked at Yeshivat Shavei Hebron in a Public Relations capacity. He has worked at Hebrew University and Yeshivat Mercaz HaRav. For the Israeli settlers of Hebron, he is the spokesperson for the community, in Israel and internationally.
David Wilder announced his resignation from the Hebron Community organization, effective April 1, 2015.
Presently he is Executive Director of Eretz.Org.

Activism
David Wilder has spoken on behalf of the Israeli settlers of Hebron and has been an activist for their interest for 21 years. When the legality of the Beit HaShalom community's ownership of their living quarters was questioned, Wilder was active in speaking out on behalf of the community. When The Jerusalem Post talked with him, they wrote that he was certain that the community "had a strong claim to the structure."

An interview with David Wilder by an Egyptian-Belgian journalist was published in May 2012.

His op-ed piece concerning the expulsion from Beit HaShalom was published in The Jerusalem Post.

Publications
David Wilder has published a number of Ebooks which can be found at his website. These include: Hebron Chronicles, Breaking the Lies, Sites in Hebron and more. He has also produced a number of apps for android which can be found here.

Family
David Wilder is the son of the late Samuel and Pamela Wilder, and is married to Ora Wilder. They lived in the Israeli settlement Kiryat Arba for 17 years and as of 2013 have lived at Beit Hadassah for 17 years. They have seven children and many grandchildren.

See also

 Yossi Dagan

References

External links
 Books, photos, blogs
  Hebron Jewish Community Web site
  Hebron Blog

1954 births
Living people
Israeli settlers
Israeli activists
American Zionists
People from Hebron
American community activists
People from New Jersey
American emigrants to Israel
Jewish American writers
Case Western Reserve University alumni
Spokespersons
21st-century American Jews